Red Holocaust may refer to:

 Red Holocaust, a 1986 novel that is part of the Deathlands series by Laurence James
 Red Holocaust, a 2009 book by Steven Rosefielde
 Der Rote Holocaust und die Deutschen (The Red Holocaust and the Germans), a 1999 book by Horst Möller

See also
 Holocaust trivialization
 Mass killings under communist regimes
 Communist holocaust (disambiguation)